The Gabreil Daveis Tavern House, also known as the Hillman Hospital House, is a historic building in the Glendora section of Gloucester Township, Camden County, New Jersey, United States.  This tavern was built in 1756 near the Big Timber Creek and housed boatmen who used the creek to ship goods to Philadelphia.  It was designated a hospital by George Washington during the Revolutionary War.

Since its restoration, it has been the focal point of the township's history.  It was listed in the New Jersey Department of Environmental Protection's Historic Preservation Office in 1973 (ID# 958), and the National Register of Historic Places in 1977 (NR reference #: 77000858).

See also
New Jersey in the American Revolution
National Register of Historic Places listings in Camden County, New Jersey
List of the oldest buildings in New Jersey

References

Commercial buildings completed in 1756
Gloucester Township, New Jersey
Houses in Camden County, New Jersey
Drinking establishments on the National Register of Historic Places in New Jersey
Houses on the National Register of Historic Places in New Jersey
Hotel buildings on the National Register of Historic Places in New Jersey
National Register of Historic Places in Camden County, New Jersey
Taverns in New Jersey
Taverns in the American Revolution
New Jersey in the American Revolution